Hawes railway station is a disused railway station that served the town of Hawes in North Yorkshire, England. It was closed in 1959 and now forms part of the Dales Countryside Museum. Since 2015, the museum has rented the building to a business operating a bike shop and later, also a cafe.

History

The station was opened in October 1878 by the Midland Railway (MR) as the terminus of their  branch line from Hawes Junction.  The MR branch made an end-on junction there with the North Eastern Railway (NER) line from Northallerton via Bedale which had been opened as far as Leyburn by 1856 and then extended onwards to Hawes in the summer of 1878.  Although the station belonged to the Midland, the NER (and later the LNER) operated most of the passenger services from there — the MR section being worked as an extension of the service to/from Northallerton.  The only exception to this was a single daily return service between Hawes and Hellifield that for much of its life was known by the somewhat unusual nickname of Bonnyface.

The NER section of the line lost its passenger service in April 1954, but the station retained a nominal service of one train each way from Hawes Junction (by then renamed Garsdale) until final closure to passengers on 16 March 1959.  Goods traffic from the Leyburn direction continued until complete closure in April 1964, after which the track was lifted and the buildings left to fall into disrepair. However, after many years of disuse, the site was purchased by the Yorkshire Dales National Park Authority and converted into a museum and tourist information centre in the early 1990s, a role it continues to fulfil to this day.  As part of this scheme, the station buildings and platforms were refurbished, a short length of track relaid. A preserved industrial tank locomotive, cosmetically painted in British Railways colours, together with a pair of ex-BR Mark 1 coaches, were installed as a static exhibit (see accompanying photo).

Although isolated from the national rail network for over fifty-five years, the Wensleydale Railway hopes to one day eventually rebuild, re-instate and re-open the currently abandoned and derelict section of line between Redmire and Garsdale (thus would involve restoring the station to its former glory and active use). However, the train with three carriages which currently resides in the platform would have to be removed and placed in a newly-constructed siding, because the project involves re-instating the entire station to its former use.

Stationmasters
Originally the station staff were provided alternately by the Midland Railway and the North Eastern Railway, but from 1 January 1901 it was agreed that the later would take on this responsibility.
Charles E. Robinson 1878 - 1883 
Henry Smith 1883 - 1895 (afterwards station master at Lee Mills)
Henry Brodie 1896 - 1903 (afterwards station master at Pontefract)
C.E. Dawson 1903 - 1905
Joseph Whitfield from 1905
John W. Sellars ca. 1911
F. Raine until 1919 (afterwards station master at Hornsea)
W. Milner 1919 - 1920 (formerly station master at Bolton-on-Dearne afterwards station master at Eastrington)
J.R. Thackray from 1939 (formerly stationmaster at Brompton)

Notes

References

Body, G. (1988), PSL Field Guides - Railways of the Eastern Region Volume 2, Patrick Stephens Ltd, Wellingborough, 
Houghton, F.W & Foster W.H (1965 Second Ed) The Story Of The Settle - Carlisle Line, Advertiser Press Ltd, Huddersfield.

Heritage railway stations in North Yorkshire
Former Midland Railway stations
Railway stations in Great Britain opened in 1878
Railway stations in Great Britain closed in 1959
Hawes
Wensleydale